The Enterprise Volleyball League, often abbreviated to the TVL (Top Volleyball League), is the amateur men's and women's volleyball leagues run by Chinese Taipei Volleyball Association (CTVA). It was founded in 2004 with the purpose of increasing Taiwan's competition ability in volleyball. CTVA plans to make the league become semi-professional or professional in the future.

Clubs

Men's clubs 
 Conti Sports
 TMFI Falcons
 Mizuno
 Taichung Apollo
 Taipower
 Win Streak

Women's clubs 
 KingWhale Taipei
 Taipower
 JSL Group
 CMFC
 Top Speed Sports Elite

Men's league

Women's league

External links 
 Enterprise Volleyball League on CTVA website 
 Enterprise Volleyball League on Taiwan Television (TTV) website 
 Hsinchu PSC volleyball team 
 Taichung Bank volleyball team 
. http://tvl.ctvba.org.tw/fixtures-results/

Volleyball in Taiwan
Sports leagues established in 2004
2004 establishments in Taiwan